Farden Township is a township in Hubbard County, Minnesota, United States. The population was 994 at the 2000 census.

Farden Township was named for Ole J. Farden, an early Norwegian settler.

Geography

Demographics
As of the census of 2000, there were 994 people, 358 households, and 277 families residing in the township. There were 510 housing units at an average density of 15.1/sq mi (5.8/km2). The racial makeup of the township was 86.92% White, 0.20% African American, 10.36% Native American, 0.10% Asian, 0.30% from other races, and 2.11% from two or more races. Hispanic or Latino of any race were 0.20% of the population.

There were 358 households, out of which 38.3% had children under the age of 18 living with them, 63.4% were married couples living together, 9.8% had a female householder with no husband present, and 22.6% were non-families. 17.0% of all households were made up of individuals, and 6.7% had someone living alone who was 65 years of age or older.  The average household size was 2.78 and the average family size was 3.13.

In the township the population was spread out, with 29.9% under the age of 18, 7.5% from 18 to 24, 29.6% from 25 to 44, 21.4% from 45 to 64, and 11.6% who were 65 years of age or older.  The median age was 34 years. For every 100 females, there were 101.6 males.  For every 100 females age 18 and over, there were 100.3 males.

The median income for a household in the township was $41,842, and the median income for a family was $44,688. Males had a median income of $30,179 versus $25,833 for females. The per capita income for the township was $16,642.  About 5.7% of families and 8.3% of the population were below the poverty line, including 8.5% of those under age 18 and 14.3% of those age 65 or over.

References

Townships in Hubbard County, Minnesota
Townships in Minnesota